Emilio Gutiérrez may refer to:

 Emilio Gutiérrez Caba (born 1942), Spanish film director and actor
 Emilio Gutiérrez (journalist) (born 1963), Mexican journalist
 Emilio Gutiérrez (footballer) (born 1971), Spanish footballer